Gruppo Sportivo Dilettantistico RapalloBogliasco, or simply RapalloBogliasco, is an Italian association football club, based in Rapallo and Bogliasco, Liguria. RapalloBogliasco currently plays in Serie D.

History

Before the merger 
Bogliasco D'Albertis was founded in 1950.

In the season 2010–11 Bogliasco D’albertis was promoted, for the first time, from Eccellenza Liguria to Serie D.

Serie D 2011–12

In the 2011–12 season Bogliasco D’albertis gained access to the Serie D promotion play-off with direct admission to the 3rd round as best semifinalist of Coppa Italia Serie D, where it was eliminated by Atletico Arezzo.

Honours 
Coppa Italia Liguria
Champions (1): 2010–11

Merger with A.S.D. Calcio Giovanile Rapallo

In the 2013 summer Bogliasco D’albertis merged with A.S.D. Calcio Giovanile Rapallo and formed a new team, G.S.D. RapalloBogliasco that plays in the Serie D championship.

Colors and badge 
The team's colors are black and white.

References

External links
Official Site 

Football clubs in Liguria
2013 establishments in Italy
Association football clubs established in 2013
Rapallo